Sir Thomas Norton, 1st Baronet (1615 – 27 August 1691) was an English politician who sat in the House of Commons  from 1685 to 1689.

Norton was the son of Simon Norton, dyer of Coventry, and his wife Prudence Jesson, daughter of John Jesson. He was created baronet of Coventry on 23 July  1661.

In 1685, Norton was elected Member of Parliament for Coventry. He held the seat to 1689.
 
Norton married Anne Jermy, daughter of John Jermy of Hutton Hall, Suffolk. They had four daughters but without male issue the baronetcy became extinct on his death.

References

1615 births
1691 deaths
People from Coventry
English MPs 1685–1687
Baronets in the Baronetage of England
Members of Parliament for Coventry